Needham Lake is a 9.9 hectare Local Nature Reserve in Needham Market in Suffolk. It is owned and managed by Mid Suffolk District Council. It is a Regionally important geological/geomorphological site (RIGS).

The lake is in former sand and gravel workings. It has diverse fauna and flora in aquatic, marsh and scrub habitats. There are grass and tarmac paths.

There is access from Coddenham Road.

References

Local Nature Reserves in Suffolk
Needham Market